In London, the Metropolitan Association for Improving the Dwellings of the Industrious Classes (MAIDIC) was a Victorian-era, philanthropically-motivated model dwellings company. The association, established in 1841, was fore-runner of the modern housing association which sought to provide affordable housing for the working classes on a privately run basis, with a financial return for investors. Although not the first society to build such homes, the Association was the first to be founded expressly for this purpose. As such it was one of the earliest adopters of the principal of the five per cent philanthropy model, outlined in the Company's resolution: "that an association be formed for the purpose of providing the labouring man with an increase of the comforts and conveniences of life, with full return to the capitalist."

History
The association was formed in 1841 by a group including Thomas Southwood Smith, George Howard, 7th Earl of Carlisle, Viscount Ebrington, Lord Haddo, Sir Ralph Howard and Thomas Field Gibson and incorporated by Royal Charter in 1845. Its first project was the Metropolitan Buildings in Old Pancras Road, Kings Cross, which consisted of 21 two-room and 90 three-room flats in five-storey blocks. It was demonstrated as an archetype of model dwellings and was visited by the Prince Consort in 1848, as well as William Gladstone, Charles Kingsley, Lord Shaftesbury, Charles Dickens and the Duke of Wellington. The principal architect on many of these dwellings was Henry Roberts who pioneered many types of model dwelling, working also with the Society for Improving the Condition of the Labouring Classes.

By 1900, the MAIDIC was one of the largest model dwellings companies operating in London, housing over 6,000 individuals. Its activities declined as other model dwellings companies and the Greater London Council grew, which offered lower rents to a wider range of candidates.

The MAIDIC later became the Metropolitan Property Association.

Buildings
Metropolitan Buildings, St Pancras Square, Kings Cross (1848)
Gibson Gardens, Stoke Newington (1880 - still existing) - named after Thomas Field Gibson
Albert Street, Mile End New Town - exhibited for the Great Exhibition
Grosvenor Estate, Gatliff Road, Pimlico (1867)
Albert Cottages, Stepney (1858 - still existing)
Alexandra Cottages, Penge (still existing)
Farringdon Road Buildings, Farringdon

See also
Model Dwellings Companies
List of existing model dwellings

References

Housing in London
Housing organisations based in London
Organisations based in London with royal patronage
Philanthropic organisations based in England
Organizations established in 1841
Model dwellings
1841 establishments in England